A Portrait of Aldo Nova is a compilation album by Canadian rock musician Aldo Nova, released in 1991. It features songs from his first three albums.

Track listing
"Fantasy"
"Hot Love"
"It's Too Late"
"Ball and Chain"
"Heart to Heart"
"Foolin' Yourself"
"Under the Gun"
"See the Light"
"Armageddon (Race Cars)"/"Armageddon"
"Monkey on Your Back"
"Hey Operator"
"Africa (Primal Love)"/"Hold Back the Night"
"All Night Long"
"Always Be Mine"
"Victim of a Broken Heart"
"Rumours of You"
"Tonight (Lift Me Up)"
"Lay Your Love On Me"

References

Aldo Nova albums
Albums produced by Aldo Nova
1992 compilation albums
Epic Records compilation albums